The water caltrop is any of three extant species of the genus Trapa: Trapa natans, Trapa bicornis and the endangered Trapa rossica. It is also known as buffalo nut, bat nut, devil pod, ling nut, mustache nut, singhara nut or water chestnut.

They bear ornately shaped fruits, which in the case of T. bicornis resemble the head of a bull or the silhouette of a flying bat. Each fruit contains a single very large, starchy seed. T. natans and T. bicornis have been cultivated in China and the Indian subcontinent for the edible seeds for at least 3,000 years.

Description 

The water caltrop's submerged stem reaches  in length, anchored into the mud by very fine roots. It has two types of leaves: finely divided, feather-like submerged leaves borne along the length of the stem, and undivided floating leaves borne in a rosette at the water's surface. Four-petalled white flowers form in early summer and are insect-pollinated. The fruit is a nut with four  barbed spines. Seeds can remain viable up to 12 years, although most germinate within the first two years.

The plant spreads by the rosettes and fruits detaching from the stem and floating to another area on currents or by fruits clinging to objects, and animals.

The unrelated Eleocharis dulcis is also called a water chestnut. Eleocharis is also an aquatic plant raised for food since ancient times in China. E. dulcis is a sedge, whose round, crisp-fleshed corms are common in Chinese food.

Chemistry 
Bicornin is an ellagitannin found in T. bicornis.

Taxonomy

Phylogeny 
The genus has an extensive fossil record, with numerous, distinctive species. Undisputed fossilized seeds have been found in Cenozoic strata starting from the Eocene throughout Europe, China and North America (though, the genus became extinct in North America prior to the Pleistocene).  The oldest known fossils attributed to the genus, however, are of leaves from Cretaceous Alaska, referred to the species, T. borealis.

Etymology 
The generic name Trapa is derived from the Latin word for "thistle", as also is another common name for the water caltrop.

The manufacturing group Mitsubishi takes its name and logo from the water caltrop.

In Eastern India, the samosa a fried or baked pastry is also called Shingara because its shape resembles that of the Shingara fruit.

History 
Investigations of archaeological material from southern Germany indicate that the prehistoric population of that region may well have relied significantly upon wild water caltrops to supplement their normal diet and, in times of cultivated cereal crop failure, water caltrops may even have been the main dietary component. Today, water caltrop is so rare in Germany that it is listed as an endangered species.

Water caltrop has been an important food for worship as prayer offerings since the Chinese Zhou Dynasty. The Rites of Zhou (second century BC) mentioned that a worshipper "should use a bamboo basket containing dried water caltrops, the seeds of Euryale ferox and caltrops" (加籩之實，菱芡栗脯). The Chinese Herbal Medicine Summary (本草備要 published in 1694, written by Wang Ang 汪昂) claims that water caltrop can help fever and drunkenness. 

In India and Pakistan, it is known as singhara or paniphal (eastern India) and is widely cultivated in freshwater lakes. The fruits are eaten raw or boiled. When the fruit has been dried, it is ground to a flour called singhare ka atta, used in many religious rituals, and can be consumed as a phalahar (fruit diet) on the Hindu fasting days, the navratas.

It was possible to buy water caltrops in markets all over Europe until 1880. In northern Italy, the nuts were offered roasted, much as sweet chestnuts (Castanea sativa) are still sold today. In many parts of Europe, water caltrops were known and used for human food until the beginning of the 20th century. Today, however, it is a rare plant in Europe. Several reasons for its near extinction exist, such as climate fluctuations, changes in the nutrient content of water bodies, and the drainage of many wetlands, ponds, and oxbow lakes.

T. natans was, however, introduced to the US State of Massachusetts around 1874, as a planting in the Harvard University Botanic Garden. Staff gardener Louis Guerineau took it upon himself to throw seeds into Fresh Pond and other Cambridge waterways. This came to the attention of Medford-based botanist George E. Davenport, who decided to bring seeds and live plants to his friend Minor Pratt, in Concord. He and Pratt seeded a pond near the Sudbury River, and he suspected Pratt of conducting additional distributions. As early as 1879, concern was voiced by botanist Charles Sprague Sargent, director of Boston's Arnold Arboretum, that this non-native species threatened to become a nuisance, based on dense growths reported in Cambridge. Davenport confessed in an entry in the Bulletin of the Torrey Botanical Club, Vol. 6, page 352: "I have several times had plants of Trapa natans that were collected in the vicinity of Boston, during the present year, brought to me for identification, and I have entertained no doubt as to the manner of its introduction into waters outside Cambridge Botanic Garden. But that so fine a plant as this, with its handsome leafy rosettes and edible nuts, which would, if common, be as attractive to boys as hickory nuts now are, can ever become a 'nuisance' I can scarcely believe."

Water caltrop has been declared an invasive species from Vermont to Virginia, and is classified as a noxious weed in Florida, North Carolina, and Washington. As of 2020, both T. natans and T. bicornis have been reported growing wild in the waterways of the United States.

In Australia and its state of New South Wales water caltrop has been declared a noxious weed.

Legality of sale and shipment in the United States
In 1956 T. natans was banned for sale or shipment in the United States, subject to a fine and/or imprisonment. This law was repealed by HR133 (116th United States Congress (2019–2020)) on December 27, 2020.

Role in fasciolopsiasis transmission 
Fasciolopsiasis is an ailment resulting from infection by the trematode Fasciolopsis buski, an intestinal fluke of humans, endemic in China, Taiwan, Southeast Asia, Indonesia, Malaysia, and India; this fluke can be transmitted via the surfaces of these and other water plants.

During the metacercarial stage in their lifecycle, the larval flukes leave their water snail hosts, and swim away to form cysts on the surfaces of water plants, including the leaves and fruit of water caltrops. If infected water plants are consumed raw or undercooked, the flukes can infect pigs, humans, and other animals.

Uses 
The fruits are edible raw or cooked, and the seeds can be eaten as well. It is also eaten on the occasion of Mid-Autumn Festival in the Sinosphere.

References

External links 

 Species Profile - Water Chestnut (Trapa natans), National Invasive Species Information Center, United States National Agricultural Library. Lists general information and resources for Water Chestnut.

Edible nuts and seeds
Hong Kong cuisine
Lythraceae